Ben Pronsky is an American voice and television actor.

Career
Pronsky studied regularly at the Larry Moss Studio and was founder and director of the Edgemar Film Festival in Santa Monica, California. He currently resides in Los Angeles. He has also done voice-work for ADV Films, Bang Zoom! Entertainment and NYAV Post. He is best known as the voice of Takashi Kamiyama from Cromartie High School, Harklight from Aldnoah.Zero, Kurotabo from the Nura series, Mu Alexius from the Magi series, and Takehito Kumagami from Charlotte.

Filmography

Animation
 The Loud House – Principal Marshall (in "Schooled!")
 Lego Marvel Spider-Man: Vexed By Venom (2019) – Venom, Security Guard #2, Delivery Guy
 Archibald's Next Big Thing – Stuart Munch
 Bob's Burgers – Additional Voices
 Pucca: Love Recipe – Tobe / Ayo / Dandy
 Spider-Man – Venom / Maximum Venom, Eddie Brock, Knull, Additional voices  
 Transformers: Combiner Wars – Rodimus Prime
 Barbie Dreamhouse Adventures – Rufus, Henry Henricson, Pirate, Coach, Dog Trainer
 Stan Lee's Cosmic Crusaders (2016) – Lazer Lord

Live-action
 The Mentalist – Poker Playing Miner
 Creepshow 3 – John
 Ray – Southern Marine
 Warning: Parental Advisory – Senator's Aide
 Workshop – Lance

Video games 

 Atelier Escha & Logy: Alchemists of the Dusk Sky – Reyfer
 Atelier Shallie: Alchemists of the Dusk Sea – Reyfer
 Akiba's Trip: Hellbound & Debriefed – Additional Voices
 The Last of Us Part 2 – WLF Militia
 God of War: Ragnarök – Additional Voices
 Spider-Man (2018) –  Additional Voices
 Spider-Man: Miles Morales – Street Criminals, Additional Voices
 Deadly Premonition 2: A Blessing in Disguise – Daniel Clarkson
 Death Stranding – Mules
Disgaea 5: Alliance of Vengeance – Killia
Dynasty Warriors 8 – Guan Xing (uncredited)
 Final Fantasy VII Remake – Butch
 Fire Emblem Echoes: Shadows of Valentia – Atlas
 Fire Emblem: Three Houses – Randolph
 Fire Emblem Warriors: Three Hopes – Randolph
Oreca Battle – Additional Voices
Soul Sacrifice – Jack Frost, Leviathan
Xenoblade Chronicles X – Additional Voices
 D4: Dark Dreams Don't Die – David Young
 Genshin Impact – Oz
 Nier Replicant ver.1.22474487139... – Additional voices
 The Legend of Heroes: Trails of Cold Steel IV – Agate Crosner

English dubbing

Anime
 Charlotte – Takehito Kumagami
 Cromartie High School – Takashi Kamiyama
 Blue Exorcist - Mike
 Durarara!!x2 – Additional Voices
 E's  – Yuki Tokugawa
 Fate/Apocrypha – Saber of Black
 Ghost in the Shell: SAC_2045 – Takanobu Yamada
 Magi: The Labyrinth of Magic – Mu Alexius
 Miss Monochrome – Additional Voices
 Mezzo – Friend A (Eps. 6–7)
 Mobile Suit Gundam SEED – Arnold Neumann (NYAV Post dub)
 Mobile Suit Gundam: Iron-Blooded Orphans – Isurugi Camich
 Nuku Nuku – Shimizaki
 Nura: Rise of the Yokai Clan – Kurotabo, Yoshidano Shosho Korefusa
 One Punch Man – Lightning Max
 Panyo Panyo Di Gi Charat – Ice, Prince
 Saiyuki – Demon 7 (Ep. 1), Li Touten (Ep. 41), Scar (Ep. 4), Wang
 Super Milk-chan – Hanage
 Sword Art Online – Additional Voices
Violet Evergarden – Benedict Bleu

Film
 Violet Evergarden: Eternity and the Auto Memory Doll – Benedict Bleu
Violet Evergarden: The Movie – Benedict Bleu
Your Name – Tsukasa Fujii

References

External links
 
 
 
 

Living people
American male television actors
American male video game actors
American male voice actors
Male actors from Los Angeles
21st-century American male actors
Year of birth missing (living people)